The RPW Women's Championship is a women's professional wrestling championship in Resistance Pro Wrestling (RPW). The first holder of the title is Melanie Cruise, who won a gauntlet match on November 25, 2011.

Title history

Combined reigns 

References

External links
  Resistance Women's Championship

Women's professional wrestling championships